Martín Pou y Roseló was a lawyer from Mallorca who was leader of the Philippine Falange.

References

Year of birth missing
Possibly living people
People from Mallorca
20th-century Spanish lawyers
Falangists
Spanish expatriates in the Philippines